Nymphéas en fleur is a painting by French artist Claude Monet. In a 2018 auction of paintings in the private collection of David Rockefeller and his wife, it was sold to another private collector for $81.7 million dollars. This was then the highest amount paid for a work by Monet.

References

Paintings by Claude Monet